Ninaithu Ninaithu Parthen is a 2007 Indian Tamil-language romance film directed by Manikandan. The film stars Vikranth and Ashita, while Karunas and Roja appeared in other pivotal role. The film produced by Babu Raja, had music scored by Joshua Sridhar and told the story of Indian student falling in love with a Pakistani girl. The film released in 2007 to below average collections and reviews.

Plot 
This movie is similar to Romeo and Juliet, a tragic love story about two star-crossed lovers. The movie focuses on the love that blossoms between an Indian student (Vikranth) and a Pakistani girl. The movie is essentially about how they must both fight against forces which oppose them. The movie outlines some of the most complex themes and problems that occur between the two countries. The story alternates between Vikranth's parents searching for him, while the flashback of the incidence are portrayed along the way. Eventually, near the end, the Pakistani girl suicides thinking her lover is going to die. However, Vikranth turns up to find her dead. This causes him to break down, eventually psychologically affecting him. As time goes on, Vikranth physical appearance changed to the point where no one recognizes him. The movie ends on a sad note, where his own mother fails to recognize her own son.

Cast

Production 
Noted cardiologist Dr K. M. Cherian made a special appearance in the film, while yesteryear actor Shankar also was roped in for the film. Delhi girl Ashitha was paired with Vikranth in the film in her debut role. About the title, director Manikandan said that the inspiration stemmed from the famous song "Ninaithu Ninaithu Parthen" from the film, 7G Rainbow Colony, directed by his mentor Selvaraghavan.

Soundtrack 
 "Naana Yaar Idhu" – Sadhana Sargam
 "Ingivalai" – Goutham, Harini Sudhakar
 "India ithu" - Joshua Sridhar

Release 
Behindwoods.com described the film, citing "taking a look at the positives of the movie (well, there are very few), the choice of subject should come first. It is a sensitive theme which has a lot of scope and the director did show good vision in choosing it. But everything else is downhill." Sify labelled it as a "big bore", citing "it is one of the most turgid and regressive movies in recent times. There is no semblance of style or substance and is extremely slow moving, or more importantly lacks a script!".

References 

2007 films
2000s Tamil-language films
Films scored by Joshua Sridhar